Le Invasioni Barbariche is an Italian television talk show hosted by the Italian journalist Daria Bignardi and is broadcast on La7.

References

Telecom Italia Media
Italian television talk shows
Current affairs shows
La7 original programming